S26 may refer to:

Aviation 
 Blériot-SPAD S.26, a French racing seaplane
 Philippine Airlines Flight S26, which crashed in 1969
 Short S.26, a British flying boat transport
 Sikorsky S-26, a Russian biplane bomber

Rail and transit 
 S26 (Berlin), a line of the Berlin S-Bahn
 Konbu Station, in Rankoshi, Isoya District, Hokkaido, Japan
 Rheineck–Walzenhausen mountain railway, a line of the St. Galen S-Bahn in Switzerland
 Tösstal railway line, a line of the Zürich S-Bahn in Switzerland

Roads 
 Shanghai–Changzhou Expressway, China
 County Route S26 (California), United States
 U.S. Route 1 in New Jersey, partially numbered S26 until 1953

Submarines 
 , of the Royal Navy
 , of the Indian Navy
 , of the United States Navy

Other uses 
 40S ribosomal protein S26
 British NVC community S26, a swamps and tall-herb fens community in the British National Vegetation Classification system
 Djabwurrung language
 S26: In case of contact with eyes, rinse immediately with plenty of water and seek medical advice, a safety phrase
 S26, a postcode district in Sheffield, England